César Gustavo Vázquez Gómez (born 16 January 1986) is a Mexican professional boxer and the current WBC Mundo Hispano Super Featherweight Champion.

Professional career
In June 2010, Vázquez beat the veteran Luis Gonzalez to capture the WBC FECOMBOX Super Featherweight Championship.

On October 29, 2010 César knocked out Antonio Meza to win the WBC Mundo Hispano Super Featherweight Championship.

References

External links
 

Boxers from Baja California
Sportspeople from Mexicali
Super-featherweight boxers
1986 births
Living people
Mexican male boxers